The name Elsie  has been used for 14 tropical cyclones in the Western Pacific Ocean, one tropical cyclone in the Australian region, and one tropical cyclone in the South-West Indian Ocean.

Western Pacific Ocean
Typhoon Elsie (1950) (T5032)
Typhoon Elsie (1954) (T5402) Major typhoon that moved up the coast of Vietnam, which then rapidly strengthened, before rapidly weakening before hitting China.
Typhoon Elsie (1958) (T5816) Typhoon that moved to the north of Japan, before transitioning into an extratropical cyclone.
Typhoon Elsie (1961) (T6110) Slow moving typhoon that neared the coast of Taiwan before speeding up. It then hit China as a moderate storm.
Typhoon Elsie (1964) (T6412) Category 3-equivalent typhoon that rapidly strengthened as it neared the coast of Luzon, before rapidly weakening right before landfall.
Typhoon Elsie (1966) (T6619) Category 4-equivalent typhoon that brought record-breaking rainfall to parts of Taiwan.
Typhoon Elsie (1969) (T6921) Super typhoon that made landfall on Taiwan as a moderate typhoon, and then went on to hit China as a category 1.
Typhoon Elsie (1972) (T7220) Moderate typhoon that slowed down before hitting Vietnam as a typhoon.
Typhoon Elsie (1975) (T7514) Super typhoon that passed to the south of Taiwan at peak intensity, before going on to hit Hong Kong as a moderate typhoon.
Typhoon Elsie (1981) (T8126) Super typhoon that stayed out to sea.
Tropical Storm Elsie (1985) (T8502) Second of two systems to form in January. Both of these systems co-existed together for about 4 days.
Tropical Storm Elsie (1988) (T8814) Short-lived system that never posed a threat to land.
Typhoon Elsie (1989) Intense super typhoon that made a catastrophic landfall on Luzon as a category 5-equivalent typhoon.
Typhoon Elsie (1992) (T9229) Super typhoon that maintained category 5 status for a day, and stayed out to sea.

Indian Ocean
Cyclone Elsie (1998)

Australian Region
Cyclone Elsie (1987)

Australian region cyclone set index articles
Pacific typhoon set index articles
South-West Indian Ocean cyclone set index articles